St Ewe is a civil parish and village in mid-Cornwall, England, United Kingdom, which is believed by hagiographers to have been named after the English moniker of Saint Avoye. The village is situated approximately five miles (8 km) southwest of St Austell.

Antiquities
Evidence of early medieval habitation is in the form of a roadside Celtic cross that once stood near Nunnery Hill (Charles Henderson in 1925 refers to it being at Lanhadron). However, the crosshead and shaft were thrown down in 1873 by a farmer looking for buried treasure, and both pieces were afterwards lost. The base has survived in situ with an inscription in insular script, unreadable except for the word crucem; Elisabeth Okasha dates the construction of this monument between the ninth and eleventh centuries.

There is another cross at Corran, about half a mile east of the churchtown. This cross is also known as Beacon Cross since its site is known as the Beacon. There is a cross at Heligan known as Bokiddick Cross; it came from Bokiddick Farm in the parish of Lanivet which was then owned by the Tremaynes who also owned Heligan. The cross in the churchtown stands on a massive base which is the only original part of it. The stones forming the cross came from elsewhere and nothing is known about the design of the original cross.

Churches
The parish church is dedicated to St Ewe, a female saint of whom very little is known. She is believed by hagiographers to be Saint Avoye of Sicily, although traditions about her life vary in content. The church was originally a Norman cruciform building: the tower and spire were added in the 14th century and the south aisle in the 15th. There is a Norman font and a fine 15th-century rood screen. The small manor of Lanewa was for a long time linked to the advowson of the church; it was probably the secular successor to a Celtic monastery.

At Tucoyse was a Wesleyan Methodist chapel, and there were formerly Bible Christian chapels at Polmassick, Paramore, Kestle and Lower Sticker.

Heligan
The Heligan estate is located at the eastern edge of the parish of St Ewe, overlooking the small port of Mevagissey. The long-term home of the Tremayne family, the estate is now best known as the location of the Lost Gardens of Heligan, a recently restored Victorian garden.

Language
St Ewe was surveyed for the Survey of English Dialects.

Notes

External links

The St Ewe Parish Website: http://st-ewe-parish.co.uk

 Genuki
 Cornwall Record Office Online Catalogue for St Ewe

Civil parishes in Cornwall
Villages in Cornwall